Henry Denny Berners (18 September  1769, London - 21 September 1852, Woolverstone) was Archdeacon of Suffolk from  1819 to 1846.

Berners was educated at St Mary Hall, Oxford.  He was Rector of Erwarton from 1801 to 1835.

References

1769 births
1852 deaths
Alumni of St Mary Hall, Oxford
Archdeacons of Suffolk